Martin Cyril D'Arcy  (15 June 1888 – 20 November 1976) was a Roman Catholic priest, philosopher of love, and a correspondent, friend, and adviser of a range of literary and artistic figures including Evelyn Waugh, Dorothy L. Sayers, W. H. Auden, Eric Gill and Sir Edwin Lutyens. He has been described as "perhaps England's foremost Catholic public intellectual from the 1930s until his death".

Background and education
Born at Bath, Somerset, the youngest of four sons of Northern Circuit barrister Martin Valentine D'Arcy and Madoline Mary (née Keegan), D'Arcy was educated at Stonyhurst, at Oxford (M.A.), and at the Gregorian University in Rome. He entered the Society of Jesus in 1907 and was ordained priest in 1921. He was Provincial of the English Province of the Society of Jesus from 1945 to 1950.

Career and legacy
He spent much of his working life at the English Jesuit house in Oxford, Campion Hall, but also spent periods in residence at American universities, including Georgetown University, Gonzaga University, Cornell, and at the Institute for Advanced Study in Princeton, New Jersey.

His major work is The Mind and Heart of Love, published by T. S. Eliot at Faber and Faber in 1945, which explores theological relation of eros love and agape love.

The permanent collection of Loyola University Museum of Art is named in his memory the Martin D'Arcy Collection.

References

Sources 
 Henry Sire, Fr Martin D'Arcy: Philosopher of Christian Love (Gracewing, 1997).
 William S. Abell (Ed.) Laughter and the Love of Friends: Reminiscences of the Distinguished English Priest and Philosopher Martin Cyril D'Arcy, S.J. (Christian Classics, Inc., 1991)

External links
Portraits of Fr D'Arcy in the National Portrait Gallery (London).

1888 births
1978 deaths
19th-century English people
20th-century English Jesuits
20th-century English Roman Catholic priests
Alumni of Campion Hall, Oxford
English Roman Catholic writers
Masters of Campion Hall, Oxford
People educated at Stonyhurst College
Philosophers of love